Transport is the movement of people or goods from place to place. 

Transport may also refer to:

Related terms
 Especially in military contexts, a vehicle used to carry supplies or personnel, e.g. transport aircraft (disambiguation) or troopship
 Transport industry
 Penal transportation, also known as "sentence to transport"

Biology and medicine 
 Movement of molecules or ions across cell membranes, including active transport and passive transport; see also secretion
 Movement of electrons in electron transport chains
 Movement of blood and other bodily fluids in the circulatory system

Geology and earth science 
 Movement of products of erosion, e.g. by a river, prior to their deposition as a sedimentary rock

Physics and technology 
 Transport phenomena, in physics, mechanisms by which particles or quantities move from one place to another
 In computer networking, the function of issuing and responding to service requests in transport layers and associated "transport protocols"
 Transport (recording), a device that handles a storage medium and extracts or records the information from and to it
 MPEG transport stream, a communications protocol for audio, video, and data
 Transport (SAP), a process of moving some or all the modifications from one SAP installation to another
 Transport layer, the fourth layer of the OSI model for networking

Other uses
 Transport Canada, a department of the government of Canada
 Transport (typeface), a typeface used on British, Italian, Spanish, and Portuguese road signs
 Transport (constituency), functional constituency in Hong Kong
 Transport (band), an Australian band from Brisbane
 Transport (album), a 2016 studio album by Borderland

See also 
 Tranceport, a DJ mix album series
 Pontiac Trans Sport, a minivan built by Pontiac
 Outline of transport
 Transports (disambiguation)
 Transportation (disambiguation)